Ilona is a feminine given name. It may also refer to:

 Ilona (film), a 1921 German film
 1182 Ilona, an asteroid
 Cyclone Ilona, which caused moderate damage in Australia in 1988
 Ilona (singer) (born 1985), Colombian singer-songwriter